Johnny Hazzard (born Frankie Valenti) is an American former pornographic actor, model, and recording artist who performs in gay and bisexual pornographic films for a number of studios, mainly Rascal Video, and has appeared in mainstream film and television productions under his own name.

He began his career in porn in 2003. Most of his porn videos were directed by Chi Chi LaRue. In August 2008, he worked on a controversial bisexual film directed by LaRue titled Shifting Gears, although he only performed in an all-male scene. He was also a music reviewer for the now defunct Frontiers magazine. 

Hazzard joined the cast of the here! original television series The Lair in seasons two and three under his birth-name, Frankie Valenti. In 2014, he appeared in the film Tiger Orange, for which he received positive critical reviews.

Awards

 Adult Erotic Gay Video Awards ("Grabbys")
 2003
 2004
 Best Duo Sex Scene with Zak Spears in Bolt, Rascal Video; tied with Tag Adams and Aiden Shaw in Perfect Fit, Hot House Entertainment
 Best Group Sex Scene with Rod Barry, Theo Blake, Alex Lemonde, Kyle Lewis, Dillon Press, Troy Punk, Shane Rollins, Rob Romoni, Anthony Shaw and Sebastian Tauza in Bolt
 2006
 Best Performers with Brad Benton
 Best Three-Way Sex Scene with Marcus Iron and Tommy Ritter in Wrong Side of the Tracks Part One, Rascal Video
 Best Group Award with Matthew Rush, Mitchell Rock, Landon Conrad and Drew Cutler in Playing With Fire 4: Alarm
GayVN Awards
2004
 Best Group Scene with Matt Summers, Logan Reed, Chad Hunt, Matt Majors, Andy Hunter, and Mike Johnson in Detention, Rascal Video
2005
 Best Group Scene with Rod Barry, Theo Blake, Alex Lemonde, Kyle Lewis, Dillon Press, Troy Punk, Shane Rollins, Rob Romoni, Anthony Shaw, and Sebastian Tauza in Bolt
 2006
 Best Actor in Wrong Side of the Tracks Part One and Part Two, Rascal Video
 Best Sex Scene: Duo with Tyler Riggz in Wrong Side of the Tracks Part One, Rascal Video
 Best Solo Performance in Wrong Side of the Tracks Part One, Rascal Video

Model 

 Chi Chi LaRue: XXXclusive 2007 Calendar (2007, 12 month calendar) 
 Chi Chi LaRue's warning (2005, 128 pages)
 Chi Chi LaRue: Live and Raw (2004, 80 pages)
 Chi Chi LaRue's Bolt: The Book
 Rascal Magazine: Special Collector's Edition (128 pages)
 Adam Gay Video 2004 Directory—Cover with Matt Summers and Kyle Kennedy

Music
Hazzard released his debut single, "Deeper Into You," in 2006.

Personal life
Hazzard was born and raised in the suburbs of Cleveland, Ohio. He is gay.

See also
 List of male performers in gay porn films
 List of Grabby recipients

References

External links

 
 

1977 births
American male pornographic film actors
American male singers
Living people
Male actors from Cleveland
American gay actors
American actors in gay pornographic films
Pornographic film actors from Ohio
LGBT people from Ohio
Gay pornographic film actors
American gay musicians
American LGBT singers
21st-century American male actors
21st-century American male singers
21st-century American singers
Musicians from Cleveland
Singers from Ohio